The 2001 Omloop Het Volk was the 55th edition of the Omloop Het Volk cycle race and was held on 3 March 2001. The race started in Ghent and finished in Lokeren. The race was won by Michele Bartoli.

General classification

References

2001
Omloop Het Nieuwsblad
Omloop Het Nieuwsblad
March 2001 sports events in Europe